Timothy Lane Olson (born August 1, 1978) is a former American professional baseball player who was an infielder for two Major League Baseball teams in the 2000s.  Olson played college baseball for the University of Florida, and thereafter, he played professionally for the Arizona Diamondbacks and Colorado Rockies.

Olson attended the University of Florida in Gainesville, Florida, where he played for coach Andy Lopez's Florida Gators baseball team in 2000.  During his single season with the Gators, he had a school-record twenty-nine-game hitting streak, and received a variety of All-American honors.  After the college season was over, Olson was selected by the Arizona Diamondbacks in the 2000 MLB Draft.

He is married to Stephanie Leigh Buyok of Farmington, New Mexico.

See also 

 Florida Gators
 List of Florida Gators baseball players

References

External links

1978 births
Living people
Arizona Diamondbacks players
Baseball players from North Dakota
Colorado Rockies players
Colorado Springs Sky Sox players
Florida Gators baseball players
Major League Baseball infielders
Major League Baseball outfielders
Oklahoma RedHawks players
Sportspeople from Grand Forks, North Dakota
Tucson Sidewinders players